Zezinho may refer to:
Zezinho (footballer, born 1930-1980), full name Moyses Ferreira Alves, Brazilian football midfielder
Zézinho (footballer, 1930-2015), full name José Gouveia Martins, Portuguese football half-back
Zezinho (footballer, born March 1992), full name José Luís dos Santos Pinto, Brazilian football winger
Zezinho (Bissau-Guinean footballer) (born 1992), full name José Luís Mendes Lopes, Bissau-Guinean football midfielder
Zezinho (footballer, born 1995), full name Inácio José Trocado Marques, Portuguese left-back